Warringah was an electoral district of the Legislative Assembly in the Australian state of New South Wales and named after and including the Warringah region of the northeastern suburbs of Sydney. It was created in 1894, when multi-member districts were abolished, and the three member district of St Leonards was divided between Warringah, St Leonards and   Willoughby. It was abolished in 1904 as a result of the 1903 New South Wales referendum, which required the number of members of the Legislative Assembly to be reduced from 125 to 90, and was partly replaced by Middle Harbour.

Members for Warringah

Election results

Notes

References

Former electoral districts of New South Wales
Constituencies established in 1894
1894 establishments in Australia
Constituencies disestablished in 1904
1904 disestablishments in Australia